Preston Smith may refer to:

 Preston Smith (American football coach) (1871–1945), American football coach at Colgate University
 Preston Smith (linebacker) (born 1992), American football outside linebacker
 Preston Smith (governor) (1912–2003), Texas governor, 1969–1973
 Preston Smith (general) (1823–1863), Civil War Confederate general
 Preston Smith (Georgia state politician), Georgia state senator, 2002–present
 Preston Smith (musician), singer/songwriter from Houston, Texas
 Lubbock Preston Smith International Airport, an airport in Texas, USA